Benjamin Becker is the defending champion, but lost in the quarterfinals to fifth seeded Teymuraz Gabashvili.
Top seed Andreas Seppi defeated surprise finalist Simon Greul.

Seeds

Draw

Finals

Top half

Bottom half

References
 Main Draw
 Qualifying Draw

Internazionali Tennis Val Gardena Sudtirol - Singles
2013 Singles